William Rand Tavern, also known as Rectory of the Christ Episcopal Church, Sykes Inn, and Smithfield Inn, is a historic inn and tavern located at Smithfield, Isle of Wight County, Virginia. It was built about 1752, and is a two-story, five bay, Georgian style brick and frame building. It has a standing-seam metal hipped roof with parged brick chimneys at the building ends.  A rear addition was built in 1922–1923.  It opened as a tavern in 1759, and operated as such until 1854, when the Vestry of Christ Church purchased it.  The church sold the property in 1892, and it resumed use as an inn in 1922.  It is now operated as a bed and breakfast.

It was listed on the National Register of Historic Places in 2004.  It is located in the Smithfield Historic District.

References

External links
Smithfield Inn website

Commercial buildings completed in 1752
Bed and breakfasts in Virginia
Drinking establishments on the National Register of Historic Places in Virginia
Georgian architecture in Virginia
Buildings and structures in Isle of Wight County, Virginia
National Register of Historic Places in Isle of Wight County, Virginia
Individually listed contributing properties to historic districts on the National Register in Virginia